The Sengge-La is a mountain of around 4700 metres in the Zanskar region in the union territory of Ladakh in northern India.

Mountains of Ladakh
Geography of Ladakh